Raj Bhavan (translation: Government House) is the official residence of the governor of Punjab and administrator of Chandigarh. Since 1985, the governor of Punjab has acted as the administrator of Chandigarh too. It is located in the capital city of Punjab ,  Chandigarh. 

Summer residence of governor of Punjab is at Hemkunj, in village of Chharabra, Shimla.

See also
  Government Houses of the British Indian Empire
 List of Governors of Punjab (British India)

References

External links
 Raj Bhavan Website
 Government of Punjab, Official website

Governors' houses in India
Buildings and structures in Chandigarh
Government of Punjab, India